Ocean View is a rural locality in the Moreton Bay Region, Queensland, Australia.

Geography 
Ocean View is north of the town of Dayboro.

Ocean View is the gateway to the mountain range of Mount Mee, about 10 minutes drive from the town of Dayboro, and located on top of the mountain. It is a very quiet and secluded rural suburb, covered with acreage properties, small farms, and winery estates.

Brisbane–Woodford Road (Mount Mee Road) runs through from south-east to west.

History 
Ocean View State School opened on 10 April 1922 using the relocated school building from Armstrong Creek. It closed in 1963.

The median age of the Ocean View population was 44 years, 7 years above the national median of 37. 76.4% of people living in Ocean View were born in Australia. The other top responses for country of birth were England 6.3%, New Zealand 3.1%, South Africa 1.6%, Germany 1.1%, Netherlands 0.6%. 92.3% of people spoke only English at home; the next most common languages were 1.1% German, 0.9% Dutch, 0.7% Afrikaans, 0.5% Polish.

Education
There are no schools in Ocean View. The nearest primary schools are Mount Mee State School in neighbouring Mount Mee to the north-west and Dayboro State School in Dayboro to the south. The nearest secondary schools are Woodford State School (to Year 10) in Woodford to the north and Bray Park State High School (to Year 12) in Bray Park to the south-east.

Facilities
 A Telstra telephone exchange
 Ocean View Rural Fire Brigade

Places of interest
Ocean View Winery Estate & Restaurant
 Glengariff Historic Estate - Winery and Restaurant (located on the Ocean View/King Scrub border)
 Gerard Poed Gallery - Panoramic Landscape Photography
 Slickers Horse Riding - Horse Riding in the beautiful scenic Oceanview/Mt Mee area
 Sophies Horse Services - Trail Rides, Lessons, Barefoot Trimming
 Rosalie Waters - Bed & Breakfast
 Oceanview Beef

References

External links
 

Suburbs of Moreton Bay Region
Localities in Queensland